Francis Gano Benedict (October 3, 1870 – April 14, 1957) was an American chemist, physiologist, and nutritionist who developed a calorimeter and a spirometer used to determine oxygen consumption and measure metabolic rate.

Biography

Born in Milwaukee, Wisconsin, Benedict attended Harvard University, earning his bachelor's degree in 1893 and his master's degree in 1894. He earned his Ph.D., magna cum laude, at Heidelberg University in 1895. He taught at Wesleyan University and did work for the U.S. Department of Agriculture. He was elected a Fellow of the American Academy of Arts and Sciences in 1909. He was also a descendant of John Gano of Revolutionary War fame, through his great-grandmother Margaret Hubbell Benedict (Gano).

After retirement in 1937 he toured and lectured about magicians. He died at his home in Machiasport, Maine, aged 86.

Fasting study

Benedict observed Agostino Levanzin, who fasted for thirty-one days at the Carnegie nutrition laboratory. George F. Cahill Jr. was influenced by the study and conducted similar studies.

Selected publications

The Influence of Inanition on Metabolism (1907)
The Composition of the Atmosphere with Special Reference to its Oxygen Content (1912)
A Study of Prolonged Fasting (1915)
Chemical and Physiological Studies of a Man Fasting Thirty-One Days (1915)
Human Vitality and Efficiency Under Prolonged Restricted Diet (1919)

References

External links
Francis Gano Benedict papers, 1870s-1957. MC 062. Harvard Medical Library, Francis A. Countway Library of Medicine, Boston, Mass.
National Academy of Sciences Biographical Memoir
 
 

1870 births
1957 deaths
American nutritionists
Fasting researchers
Fellows of the American Academy of Arts and Sciences
Harvard University alumni
Scientists from Milwaukee
Heidelberg University alumni
Wesleyan University faculty
American expatriates in Germany